This is a list of statistics for the 2015 Cricket World Cup. Each list contains the top-five records except for the partnership records.

Team statistics

Highest team totals

Largest winning margin

By runs

By wickets

By balls remaining

Lowest team totals
This is a list of completed innings only, low totals in matches with reduced overs are omitted except when the team was all out. Successful run chases in the second innings are not counted.

Smallest winning margin

By runs

By wickets

By balls remaining

Individual statistics

Batting

Most runs

Highest scores

Most boundaries

Most ducks

Bowling

Most wickets

Best bowling figures

Most maidens

Most dot balls

Hat-tricks

Fielding

Most dismissals
This is a list of wicket-keepers with the most dismissals in the tournament.

Most catches
This is a list of the fielders who took the most catches in the tournament.

Other statistics

Highest partnerships
The following tables are lists of the highest partnerships for the tournament.

See also
 2011 Cricket World Cup statistics

References

External links
Official 2015 World Cup site
Cricket World Cup at icc-cricket.com

Cricket World Cup statistics
statistics